Latu may be,

Latu language

People
Latu Maharaj (Hindu mystic)

Akapei Latu
Cameron Latu (born 2000), American football player
Cathrine Latu
George Latu
Jenny Latu
Leilani Latu
Nili Latu
Patrick Latu
Penieli Latu
Sam Latu
Sinali Latu
Sione Latu
Tolu Latu
Viliami Latu
Brenda Heather-Latu
Abigail Latu-Meafou
Tevita Leo-Latu
Latu Fifita
Latu Makaafi
Latu Vaeno
Latu Vaʻeno

Surnames of Tongan origin
Tongan-language surnames